Nefertiti, figlia del sole is a 1994 Italian film directed by Guy Gilles.

Synopsis 
The film follows the theory that Nefertiti was a princess of the Mitanni, sent to marry Pharaoh Amenhotep III, then taken by Akhenaten as his wife. The plot is based on the desire for an archaeologist to find a means revive himself several millennia after his death.

Cast 
Michela Rocco di Torrepadula as Nefertiti
Ben Gazzara as Amenhotep III
François Négret as Akhenaton
Antonella Lualdi as Tiyl
Giada Desideri
Paul Blain as Yamo
Daniel Duval as Monkutura
Jacques Penot as Bonchardt
Cléonas Shannon as Arakat
Marilyn Pater as Parkat
Nini Crépon as Hori
Guy Cuevas as Min
Gennady Krihkina as Ay

References

External links 

1994 films
Italian drama films
1990s French-language films
Films set in ancient Egypt
1994 drama films
Films directed by Guy Gilles
Cultural depictions of Akhenaten
Cultural depictions of Nefertiti
Cultural depictions of Tutankhamun
1990s Italian films